Kaffrine Department is one of the 45 departments of Senegal, and is located in the Kaffrine Region, formerly part of the Kaolack Region.

The main settlements are the communes of Kaffrine and Nganda.

Historic sites in Kaffrine department

 Megalithic site of Keur Ali Ngane
 Megalithic site of Sorokogne
 Megalithic site of Keur Modi Toy
 Megalithic site of Pathé Tiangaye
 Megalithic site of Keur Ali Lobé
 Megalithic site of Kounou Mbayèn

References

Departments of Senegal
Kaffrine Region